Midland School, located in North Branch (in Branchburg Township, New Jersey), in Somerset County, New Jersey, United States, is a non-profit special education school serving the individual social, emotional, academic and career needs of children with developmental disabilities.  The school serves 245 students, ranging in age from 5 to 21 years old, from central and northern New Jersey. With 245 students and 36.9 classroom teachers (on an FTE basis), the school has a student–teacher ratio of 6.6.

The school was founded in 1960 to meet the educational needs of two “brain injured” children for whom no educational program could be found.

Students are placed in Midland School by their home school districts, which pay tuition for their students to attend.  Additional operating funds are provided through the fund-raising programs of the Midland Foundation.

Awards and recognition
During the 1989-90 school year and again during the 1996-97 school year, Midland School was recognized with the Blue Ribbon School Award of Excellence by the United States Department of Education, the highest award an American school can receive.

Sports
soccer
basketball
wrestling
softball

School events
Gym
Careers
Music
Shop
Sport Fridays

References

External links 
Midland School
Data for Midland School, National Center for Education Statistics

Branchburg, New Jersey
Private elementary schools in New Jersey
Private high schools in Somerset County, New Jersey
Private middle schools in New Jersey
Educational institutions established in 1960
1960 establishments in New Jersey